"High on You" is a song by British drum and bass DJ and record production duo Sigma and English singer John Newman. The song was released as a digital download on 12 June 2020 by 3 Beat Records as the eighth single from the duo's second studio album, Hope. The song was written by Christopher Tempest, George Henry Tizzard, John Newman, Rick Parkhouse and Sam Preston.

Music video
A music video to accompany the release of "High on You" was first released onto YouTube on 26 June 2020. The video shows two single neighbours on quarantine during the COVID-19 pandemic entering a "socially distanced" relationship. Talking about the video, Sigma said, "It was really hard to get a video done in the lockdown period, but we knew that we wanted to do one which reflected the frustrations of this horrible time we are going through [...] it's very tongue in cheek."

Track listing

Personnel
Credits adapted from Tidal.
 Joe Lenzie – producer, associated performer, music production
 Christopher Tempest – composer, lyricist
 George Henry Tizzard – composer, lyricist
 John Newman – composer, lyricist, associated performer, vocals
 Rick Parkhouse – composer, lyricist
 Sam Preston – composer, lyricist
 Stuart Hawkes – mastering engineer, studio personnel
 Mark Ralph – mixer, studio personnel

Charts

Release history

References

2020 singles
2020 songs
John Newman (singer) songs
Songs written by George Tizzard
Songs written by Preston (singer)
Songs written by John Newman (singer)
Songs written by Rick Parkhouse